Bronwyn is a Welsh feminine given name, a variant of the mostly feminine version Bronwen/Branwen, literally meaning "White Raven (or Crow)" or, abstractly, "White Breast" (from bran, raven, and bron ("breast") and [g]wen ("white, fair, blessed)".  Because the suffix -wyn is grammatically masculine in Welsh, Bronwyn is a spelling generally only used for female names in the English-speaking world outside Wales. The name may refer to:

People
Bronwyn Bancroft (born 1958), Australian artist
Bronwyn Bishop (born 1942), Australian politician
Bronwyn Calver (born 1969), Australian cricketer
Bronwyn Drainie (born 1945), Canadian journalist
Bronwyn Eagles (born 1980), Australian athlete
Bronwyn Eyre (born 1971), Canadian provincial politician
Bronwyn Halfpenny (born 1963), Australian politician
Bronwyn Hayward, New Zealand political scientist
Bronwyn Hill (born 1960), British civil servant
Bronwyn Labrum, New Zealand cultural historian and author
Bronwyn Law-Viljoen, South African writer, editor, publisher and professor
Bronwyn Lea (born 1969), Australian writer
Bronwyn Lundberg, American digital artist and painter
Bronwyn Mayer (born 1974), Australian water polo player
Bronwyn Oliver (1959–2006), Australian sculptor
Bronwyn Pike (born 1956), Australian politician
Bronwyn Thompson (born 1978), Australian athlete

Fictional characters
Bronwyn, a fictional virgin bride from the 1965 Charlton Heston movie, The War Lord
Bronwyn Davies, in the Australian television series Neighbours
Bronwyn Bruntley, in the book series Miss Peregrine, and in the film Miss Peregrine's Home for Peculiar Children
Bronwyn Rojas, in the book One of Us Is Lying by Karen M. McManus
Bronwyn, in the American television series Adventure Time, is Kim Kil Whan's daughter and Jake and Lady Rainicorn's granddaughter
Bronwyn Jones, in the British animated television series Fireman Sam, titular Sam's sister-in-law, mother of James and Sarah
Bronwyn, is a character played by Nazanin Boniadi in The Rings of Power television series by Amazon Studios. The character does not appear in the Legendarium,  and was created for the show.

References

Gaelic-language given names
English feminine given names